Chao Wu (born 1976/1977) is an American politician. He is a member of the Maryland House of Delegates for District 9A in Howard County, Maryland. He was previously a member of the Howard County Board of Education from 2018 to 2022.

Background
Wu attended the University of Science and Technology of China, where he earned a Bachelor of Engineering degree in 2001; the National University of Singapore, where he earned a master degree in electrical and computer engineering in 2003; and the University of Maryland, College Park, receiving a Doctor of Philosophy degree in electrical and computer engineering in 2009. While at the University of Maryland, Wu served as president of the local Chinese Students and Scholars Association (CSSA) chapter. As CSSA president, Wu campaigned against Tibetan independence and against content in The Diamondback perceived as negative toward the 2008 Summer Olympics in Beijing.

After graduating, he worked in the private and public sectors, specializing in data science, machine learning, artificial intelligence, quantum computing, cybersecurity and enterprise risk management. Wu represented the River Hill community of Columbia, Maryland on the Columbia Association's board of directors until 2018, and served as a board member of the River Hill Village Association from 2012 to 2018. During this time, Wu was instrumental in initiating Columbia's sister city agreement with Liyang.

In November 2017 Wu filed to run for the Howard County Board of Education. He won the nonpartisan primary election on June 27, 2018, and later won election to the board on November 6. In December 2020, Wu was elected as the Board of Education's chairperson, becoming the first Asian American to lead the board. In October 2021, Wu was named to serve as a board member to the Maryland Association of Boards of Education.

In February 2022 Wu filed to run for the Maryland House of Delegates. He won the Democratic primary on July 19, 2022, and later won the general election on November 8, defeating incumbent state delegate Trent Kittleman with Natalie Ziegler.

In the legislature
Wu was sworn into the Maryland House of Delegates on January 11, 2023. He is a member of the House Ways and Means Committee.

Personal life
Wu lives in Clarksville, Maryland. He is a father of two children.

Political positions
In June 2021 Wu voted against ending the school system's school resource officer program. The school board voted 5–3 to continue the program.

Electoral history

References

External links
 

1970s births
21st-century American politicians
Asian-American people in Maryland politics
Living people
Democratic Party members of the Maryland House of Delegates
National University of Singapore alumni
University of Maryland, College Park alumni
University of Science and Technology of China alumni
People from Yingshan County, Hubei
School board members in Maryland